Edward Courtenay may refer to:
 
Edward de Courtenay, 3rd/11th Earl of Devon (c. 1357–1419)
Sir Edward de Courtenay (c. 1385–1418)
Edward Courtenay, 1st Earl of Devon (1485 creation) (died 1509), English nobleman
 Edward Courtenay, 1st Earl of Devon (1526–1556), English nobleman
 Edward Courtenay, 12th Earl of Devon (1836–1891), British peer and politician
Ed Courtenay (born 1968), ice hockey player

See also
Edward Courtney (disambiguation)